Lady Barnacle is a 1917 American silent comedy film, directed by John H. Collins. It stars Viola Dana, Robert Walker, and Augustus Phillips, and was released on June 4, 1917.

Cast list
 Viola Dana as Lakshima
 Robert Walker as George Morling
 Augustus Phillips as Maharajah Bhartari-Hari Pal Singh
 William B. Davidson as Krishna Dhwaj
 Henry Hallam as John Morling
 Marie Adell as Mary Fanning
 Fred Jones as Asoka-Kuhan-Ray
 Henry Leone as Nizam of Bandorporia
 Ricca Allen as Anne Marble
 Harry Linson as Rev. Enoch T. Fanning
 Gerald Griffin as Capt. O'Malley
 Nellie Grant as Lakshima's maid

References

External links 
 
 
 

1917 comedy films
1917 films
Silent American comedy films
Metro Pictures films
American silent feature films
American black-and-white films
Films directed by John H. Collins
1910s English-language films
1910s American films